Marco Vaccari (born 17 July 1966 in Milan) is a retired Italian sprinter who specialized in the 400 metres.

Career
Vaccari won seven medals in international athletics competitions, six of these with national relays team. His personal best time is 45.47 seconds, achieved in June 1992 in Bologna. He participated at two editions of the Summer Olympics (1992 and 1996), he earned 36 caps with the national team from 1989 to 1999.

Achievements

National titles
He has won six individual national championship titles.
400 metres: 1992, 1994, 1997, 1999
200 metres indoor: 1996
400 metres indoor: 1997

See also
 Italian all-time lists - 400 metres
 Italy national relay team

References

External links
 

1966 births
Living people
Athletes from Milan
Italian male sprinters
Olympic athletes of Italy
Athletes (track and field) at the 1992 Summer Olympics
Athletes (track and field) at the 1996 Summer Olympics
World Athletics Championships athletes for Italy
Athletics competitors of Fiamme Azzurre
Mediterranean Games gold medalists for Italy
Mediterranean Games silver medalists for Italy
Athletes (track and field) at the 1991 Mediterranean Games
Athletes (track and field) at the 1997 Mediterranean Games
Mediterranean Games medalists in athletics
World Athletics Indoor Championships medalists
Italian Athletics Championships winners